Persquen is a commune in the Morbihan department of Brittany in north-western France. Inhabitants of Persquen are called in French Persquennois.

Geography

Persquen is located south of Guémené-sur-Scorff. The river Scorff forms part of the commune's northern border. Historically, the village belongs to Vannetais and Pays Pourlet.

Map

See also
Communes of the Morbihan department

References

External links

 Mayors of Morbihan Association 

Communes of Morbihan